This is a list of the French SNEP Top 200 Singles and Top 200 Albums number-ones of 2020.

Number ones by week

Singles chart

Albums chart

See also
2020 in music
List of number-one hits (France)
List of top 10 singles in 2020 (France)

References

France
2020
2020 in French music